Viničko Kale is an ancient ruin located on the hill above the town of Vinica,  Macedonia. It is located on the left side of the Grdečka River, on a hill about 400 meters above sea level. Viničko Kale was discovered in 1954. In 1978, 5 fragments of terra-cotta icons were discovered in Viničko Kale, which shows that it was inhabited from Neolithic times to the Middle Ages.

See also 
List of castles in North Macedonia

External links
http://makedonija.name/culture/vinicko-kale

Archaeological sites in North Macedonia
Castles in North Macedonia
Former populated places in the Balkans
Vinica Municipality, Macedonia